Annette Focks (born 28 August 1964) is a German musician and film score composer. She contributed to more than eighty films since 1997 including Night Train to Lisbon, Four Minutes and John Rabe.

Education
Annette Focks studied film score composition at the  Hochschule für Theater und Musik in München. She then worked in  workshops of sound-designer Randy Thom (Forrest Gump) and orchestrator Steven Scott Smalley („Batman“).

References

External links 

1964 births
Living people
German film score composers